Busbridge is a village and civil parish in the borough of Waverley in Surrey, England that adjoins the town of Godalming. It forms part of the Waverley ward of Bramley, Busbridge and Hascombe.  It was until the Tudor period often recorded as Bushbridge and was a manor and hamlet of Godalming until gaining an ecclesiastical parish in 1865 complemented by a secular, civil parish in 1933.  Gertrude Jekyll lived at Munstead Wood in the Munstead Heath locality of the village.  Philip Carteret Webb and Chauncy Hare Townshend, the government lawyer/antiquarian and poet respectively owned its main estate, Busbridge House, the Busbridge Lakes element of which is a private landscape garden and woodland that hosts a wide range of waterfowl.

The parish covers northern, heavily wooded foothills of the Greensand Ridge and drains separately to east and west into tributaries of the Wey.

History
Busbridge was wholly in the Anglo-Saxon hundred of Godalming, Surrey but had at the Domesday Book of 1086 no entries, being a rural, farmed part of Godalming and wooded part within the Weald, a remnant forest stretching into Sussex and West Kent.

Upper Eashing or High tithing in the 13th century Hundred Rolls formed early Busbridge, as the name Busbridge began to be used after de Bushbridge, the medieval family who came to own the manor by the 15th century.  They came from Kent and are first recorded here in 1384 as 'Burssabrugge' or 'Burrshebrugge'.

Manor
James de Bushbridge sold Bushbridge or Busbridge to John Eliot of Godalming under Henry VIII. The heirs were son William (1624–1697) and then grandsons William, born (1671–1708) and Laurence, who sailed with Drake round the world, and who sold the property in 1710. Subsequently the house passed through many owners. Among these was Philip Carteret Webb, FRS, born 1702, M.P. for Haslemere 1754–67 and solicitor to the Treasury 1756–65. He was a distinguished lawyer, antiquary, and collector. He died at Busbridge in 1770. The poet, Chauncy Hare Townshend, was born at the house in 1798, his father having bought it two years earlier. By 1911 a Mr. P. Graham owned the house, having replaced it between 1906 and 1911 with a new house in the early 20th century Edwardian style.

Establishment of a church and two types of parish
The Church of St. John the Baptist is of Bargate stone with chalky limestone quoins, a central tower and windows.  It was built in a 13th-century style, consecrated on completion in 1867. Its designer was George Gilbert Scott, it is Grade II* listed; it technically lies just over the civil parish boundary in the borders of Crownpits/Holloway Hill in Godalming.

Busbridge gained an ecclesiastical parish in 1865 complemented by a secular, civil parish in 1933.

Economy
The village's economy is bound closely to Godalming as the two settlements are contiguous, that is, the part of Busbridge where most of its residents live as it forms a scattered settlement, rather than a nucleated village.  The latter large town is formed of six surrounding suburban villages, together with an urban centre with a railway station on the Portsmouth Direct Line which runs from London, diverging from the SWML at Woking, and bordered on the far side by the A3.  Two occupation groups employed approximately half of the workforce at the 2011 census, namely:  managers, directors and senior officials (78 workers) and professional occupations (81 workers).

Amenities

Recreation grounds
Busbridge Tennis Association is a community initiative which was fundamental in the process of renovating the tennis courts and recreation ground at the top of Holloway Hill and overlooking Godalming. In 2012 they secured £37,900 of Olympic Legacy Funding from Sport England's Inspired Facilities Fund for flood lights on all four courts allowing for expansion with junior tennis training.

Parks, woodland and paths
Based on the area recorded by the Office for National Statistics at the 2001 census to calculate population density, the parish covered  – most of the centre and south-east of the parish is forested.

Localities

Munstead Heath
This sparsely populated bulk of the parish has a minority of farmland but is otherwise part of the remaining area of The Weald, forming much of the green buffers between settlements in the south of the county.

A small triangular park, Munstead Wood extends from the heath a small way into one of Godalming's outer six suburban localities, Holloway Hill.  This is grade II* listed in the 'park and gardens' category, containing Gertrude Jekyll's landscaped woodland home (see landmarks below).  North Munstead is a hamlet sometimes marked on most detailed maps toward Hascombe.  Its most notable location in the area is Winkworth Arboretum owned and maintained by the National Trust since after the Second World War.

Tuesley
Tuesley is a hamlet of the village 300m west of the main settled corner of Busbridge, used for strategic meetings under the formative manor system developed by them.

It is named for the Anglo-Saxon war-god Tīw and literally translates as his clearing (Tīwes lēah). This affirms the area as within the remnant Weald which is the Germanic Old English for a forest, where trees were cut and a temple to the god created. Sometime in 7th century, the temple was consecrated by Christians and a small chapel was erected.

Tuesley appears in Domesday Book of 1086 as Tiwesle as a subsidiary manor of Godalming that rendered £2 to its overlord. It was held by Rannulf Flambard from (under) William the Conqueror and its recordable assets were: 1 hide and 1 plough and it had 8 households, one of which was a slave/serf.

In 1220 the name was Tiwerlei.  recorded in the Salisbury Register of St Osmund in 1220 as a chapel, still standing but in a ruinous state dedicated to the Blessed Virgin, the first church established in the manor, so known and recorded in Godalming records as "the mother church or the Oldminster" for centuries. By 1220, services were held only three times a year. A fair was held in the field on Lady Day (a quarter-day in the same cycle as Christmas) until 1540. The foundations of the "minster" were partly excavated in 1860 before covered up – only dry-stone walls and boundary posts mark the rectangle of the buried ruins.

In 1956 Tuesley Court Farm was acquired by a Roman Catholic Holy Order and renamed Ladywell Convent by the Lady Well, part of the series of lakes forming much of the stream running through Busbridge, as part of this sale it acquired the earlier converted pagan sanctuary and erected a statue of the Virgin Mary.   The convent is north of the stream and so, although associated with Tuesley Court, was a later addition and is not part of the hamlet or village, instead being still part of Godalming.

Hydestile (north-east only)
A small linear settlement on a minor crossroad, Hydestile includes Busbridge Court Farm which strengthens its partial connection with the village, other than the ancient boundaries still used for the civil and ecclesiastical parish running to the crossroads.  Hydon Hill, a Leonard Cheshire Disability hospice/retreat is in this part of Busbridge.

Landmarks

Munstead Wood
The main feature of Munstead Heath, which is a triangular woodland dotted with homes, is the Edwin Lutyens-built house (finished in 1897) of Gertrude Jekyll, one of the most important figures in gardening worldwide in the 19th and 20th centuries – this is Grade I listed.

Busbridge Lakes
Busbridge Lakes is a grade II* heritage  site or landscape (in the parks and garden special category) listed for its manmade follies, grottos, clear lakes and wide range of trees and extends into the informal area of Ladywell, Tuesley, part of which is publicly accessible at no charge, such as the smallest lake, Lady Well, and the modern dry-stone walling above an Anglo-Saxon pagan shrine to the god Týr or Tiw, see above.

This consists of 3 lakes, nature trails and a wooded hillside containing a largest collection of wild waterfowl. The owners state the site has 130 species of swans, geese and ducks, many endangered, rare pheasants, cranes and other exotic birds.  The landscape is open to the public on selected days, on private booking, open for schools, clubs and private parties.

Memorials
The village churchyard contains several significant memorials by architect, Edwin Lutyens, who also designed the house at Munstead Wood for his friend and collaborator Gertrude Jekyll. Lutyens designed Busbridge War Memorial, a Grade II* listed structure, unveiled in 1922, one of fifteen of his War Crosses, which share a similar design. The names of the village's war dead are listed on a plaque inside the church. He also designed memorials to Julia Jekyll (Gertrude's mother), Francis McLaren, and a joint memorial to Sir Herbert Jekyll (Gertrude's brother) and his wife Dame Agnes Jekyll, and to Gertrude herself.

Demography and housing
At the United Kingdom Census 2011 the population stood at 21 higher than ten years earlier, living in 267 households.

Population figures from older censuses are inaccurate for direct comparisons, due to parish boundary changes  in the 1950s, which caused the population 'to decline' from 1,458 in 1951, to 1,039 in 1961 in line with the area lost to the adjoining town.

The average level of accommodation in the region composed of detached houses was 28%, the average that was apartments was 22.6%.

The proportion of households in the civil parish who owned their home outright compares to the regional average of 35.1%.  The proportion who owned their home with a loan compares to the regional average of 32.5%.  The remaining % is made up of rented dwellings (plus a negligible % of households living rent-free).

Transport

Rail

Roads
The area is served by three mid-distance local roads converging on the south of Godalming, each scaling the wooded slopes of the Greensand Ridge; none are dual carriageways.  The main road through the village is the B2130 Brighton Road which connects Godalming and Dunsfold.

References

External links

 
Civil parishes in Surrey
Place names
Borough of Waverley